Anping is a county located in the middle of Hebei Province, it is about  away from Shijiazhuang, the provincial capital. Anping is known for its metal wire mesh in China and around the world. Over five hundred years ago, Anping people began to weave wire mesh products. There are 6700 factories and/or workshops engaged in production of metal wire mesh products and over 100,000 people in production and sales of metal wire mesh. Export quantity of metal wire mesh products from Anping accounts for over half of that of China.

Following the fast development of trading business with the world, the related industries as international trading, travel and translation agents emerged like mushrooms after rain who provide business help for coming visitors from the world, such as SinoGuider, Mearsk, Cosco, Sinotrans, CMA, CN-13shipping, Evergreen-Marine for transporting and trading services, and SinoGuider company specially for language translation and business guidance services.

Anping county won many titles due to the strong trading business of iron wire mesh, such as National-level county, Base of China Wire Mesh, National Advanced County.

There is a national class commodity fair in Anping named "Anping Iron Wire Mesh World" where coming visitors can easily find hundreds of factories and agents who display their products.

Administrative Divisions
Towns: Anping, Madian, Nanwangzhuang.

Townships: Dahezhuang Township, Chengyouzi Township, Xiliangwa Township, Daziwen Township, Donghuangcheng Township.

Climate

References

External links 

 
County-level divisions of Hebei
Hengshui